Federation Forest State Park is a  Washington state park on the White River in King County. The park features an old-growth forest that includes Douglas fir, western hemlock, Sitka spruce, and western redcedar trees. Park amenities include  of hiking trails, picnicking facilities, and an interpretive center.

History
 The park gets its name from the Washington state chapter of the General Federation of Women's Clubs (GFWC-WS), which raised the initial $25,000 that was used to purchase the land for the park from a lumber company in 1928. GFWC-WS members were concerned about the rapid pace of deforestation around the country and wanted to preserve the remaining old-growth forest in the state of Washington. In the following years, windstorms, widening of an adjacent highway, and logging on the adjacent property took a toll on the park, and the land was eventually sold back to the lumber company in 1938.

After about a decade, the new present-day location along the White River was chosen and dedicated in 1949. In 1958, local educator and GFWC-WS member, Catherine T. Montgomery left the money from her estate to the park. The money was used to build the Catherine Montgomery Interpretive Center.

Facilities
The Catherine Montgomery Interpretive Center has exhibits on the history the General Federation of Women's Clubs and the Salish people early presence along the White River.  In front of the Interpretive Center is native plant identification garden with markers identifying over two dozen plants.  From the Interpretive Center a series of hiking trails fan out into the park.  
 Fred Cleator Interpretive trail includes and east loop and a longer.  Both loops provide information signs along the route, explaining the diversity of the forest landscape.
The Naches Trail is the original path first used by the Salish traversing the Cascades by the Naches Pass. It later became an early route for path for travel to Fort Steilacoom. By 1884 it was abandoned for easier routes across the mountains.
Land of the Giants Interpretive Trail is a self-guided trail through an old-growth forest.
Wind in the Woods Trail loop with sign describing the effects of wind on a forest.
The Esther Maltby Trail on the River is a primitive trail along the White River. This is a difficult trail due to the changes that occur each year from winter weathers and spring floods. Part of the trail uses a boardwalk and a stairway create a return loop. The trail is dedicated Esther Maltby a leader in the GFWC.
North Trail is across or north of Highway 410 and travels through hills, marshes and over mud slides.

References

External links
Federation Forest State Park Washington State Parks and Recreation Commission 
Federation Forest State Park Map  Washington State Parks and Recreation Commission

State parks of Washington (state)
Parks in King County, Washington